Thrissur Zoo or State Museum & Zoo, Thrissur (formerly the Trichur Zoo) is a  zoo that opened in 1885 in a small area called Chembukkavu, in the heart of Thrissur City, Kerala, India. It is one of the oldest zoos in the country, and is home to a wide variety of animals, reptiles, and birds. The zoo compound includes a natural history museum and an art museum that showcase the social and cultural heritage of the region. Being one of the two Zoological Parks in the state of Kerala, it sees many visitors on a regular basis. Still and video cameras are allowed in the park for a small fee.

Exhibits

The zoo includes a Zoological Garden, Botanical Garden, Art Museum, and Natural History Museum in its compound.

The future

The new zoo will be close to the Peechi Dam, Kerala Forest Research Institute, Kerala Agricultural University, College of Forestry, and College of Veterinary and Animal Sciences.

Gallery

Notes

External links

Official website of: "Central Zoo Authority of India" (CZA), Government of India

Zoos in Kerala
Parks in Thrissur
1885 establishments in India
Zoos established in 1885
Buildings and structures in Thrissur
Tourist attractions in Thrissur